Ivan Krolo (born 23 January 2003) is a Croatian footballer currently playing as a midfielder for Hajduk Split.

Club career
Krolo signed a professional contract with Hajduk in 2022 August until the summer of 2027. Hajduk loaned krolo moved to fellow Dalmatian first league side Šibenik for the second half of the season.

Personal life 
Krolo grew up in Solin with family roots originally from Kamensko.

References

External links

2003 births
Living people
Footballers from Split, Croatia
Association football midfielders
Croatian footballers
Croatia youth international footballers
HNK Hajduk Split players
First Football League (Croatia) players
Croatian Football League players